Leida de la Caridad Chirino Calderín (born 18 January 2000) is a Cuban footballer who plays as a forward for the Cuba women's national team.

International career
Chirino capped for Cuba at senior level during the 2020 CONCACAF Women's Olympic Qualifying Championship qualification.

References

2000 births
Living people
Cuban women's footballers
Cuba women's international footballers
Women's association football forwards